Kacper Gondek (5 January 1993 - 26 January 2018) was a Polish slalom canoeist who competed at the international level from 2008 to 2015.

He competed in C1 and C2 and had success in both categories at the junior and under-23 level, winning three silver medals at the World Championships (C1 Junior: 2010, C1 team Junior: 2010 and C1 team U23: 2013). His C2 partner was Wojciech Pasiut.

Kacper died on 26 January 2018 after succumbing to cancer.

His brother Kamil Gondek is also a former successful junior slalom canoeist from 2007-2010.

References

Polish male canoeists
1993 births
2018 deaths